The Wonderful Day (French: La merveilleuse journée) is a 1929 French silent comedy film directed by René Barberis and starring Dolly Davis, André Roanne and Renée Passeur. It was remade as the sound film The Wonderful Day in 1932.

Cast
 Dolly Davis as Gladys - une infirmière  
 André Roanne as Blaise - un préparateur en pharmacie  
 Renée Passeur as L'inconnue  
 Sylvio De Pedrelli as Le milliardaire Felloux  
 Marcel Lesieur as Le docteur Gébus  
 Reine Derns as Léocadie  
 Stella Dargis 
 Léon Larive as Le pharmacien Pinède  
 Pierre Delmonde 
 Albert Mafer as Le capitaine 
 Jane Dolys 
 Jane Pierson

References

Bibliography 
 Philippe Rège. Encyclopedia of French Film Directors, Volume 1. Scarecrow Press, 2009.

External links 
 

1929 films
French silent feature films
1920s French-language films
Films directed by René Barberis
French films based on plays
French comedy films
1929 comedy films
French black-and-white films
Silent comedy films
1920s French films